Ice Station Zebra is a 1968 American espionage thriller film directed by John Sturges and starring Rock Hudson, Patrick McGoohan, Ernest Borgnine, and Jim Brown. The screenplay is by Alistair MacLean, Douglas Heyes, Harry Julian Fink, and W. R. Burnett, loosely based on MacLean's 1963 novel. Both have parallels to real-life events that took place in 1959. The film was photographed in Super Panavision 70 and presented in 70 mm Cinerama in premiere engagements. The original music score is by Michel Legrand.

Plot 
A person approaches, guided by a homing beacon, while a second person secretly watches from nearby.

Immediately afterwards distress calls begin to be broadcast from Ice Station Zebra. Little can be wrung from them beyond that there was a fire and casualties in some sort of disaster. Commander James Ferraday, captain of the American nuclear attack submarine USS Tigerfish stationed at Holy Loch, Scotland, is ordered by Admiral Garvey of Naval Intelligence to rescue the survivors, outside the normal chain of command, with confirming orders through regular channels to follow.

He is told only about the ice station incident. An imperious British intelligence agent, "Mr. Jones", and a U.S. Marine platoon join the Tigerfish while in dock. After setting sail, a helicopter delivers Captain Anders, a strict officer who takes command of the Marines, and an old comrade of Jones, Boris Vaslov, a Russian defector and spy.

The submarine sails beneath the thick Arctic pack ice but is unable to break through with its conning tower. Ferraday instead orders a torpedo shot to fracture the ice. When the inner torpedo hatch is opened to load it, sea water rushes in, flooding the compartment. The extra weight causes the submarine to nosedive, which is only arrested as the boat reaches crushing depth.

Jones asserts it was no accident and Ferraday discovers evidence of sabotage. Ferraday suspects Vaslov, while Jones points to Anders. After an area of thin ice is detected, the Tigerfish breaks through to the surface. Ferraday, Vaslov, Jones, and the marine platoon set out for the weather station in a blizzard. On arrival, they find the base almost completely destroyed. Jones and Vaslov start questioning a few hypothermic survivors about what happened.

Jones reveals to Ferraday that he is looking for a canister of film with immense Cold War implications. It was shot by an advanced experimental camera designed by the British, which uses special film developed by the Americans, both of which were stolen by the Soviets and sent into orbit to photograph locations of American missile silos. However, the satellite also recorded all the Soviet missile sites.

Due to a malfunction, it ejected its film delivery capsule near Ice Station Zebra. Both Soviet and British agents were deployed to recover the capsule. Jones concludes the Soviet agent slew the British agent, with some scientists dying by gunfire before the fire was set to cover the agent's tracks.

After being summoned by Ferraday through a hole in the ice, the Tigerfish erupts immediately adjacent to the camp. Ferraday sets his crew to search for the capsule. Jones discovers a tracking device but is knocked out by Vaslov, a Soviet double agent and the saboteur. Anders confronts Vaslov and the two men fight before the dazed Jones shoots and kills Anders. Ferraday enters the hut and is alarmed at discovering Jones bloodied and unconscious, Anders riddled with half a dozen gunshots, and Vaslov unharmed. He appears to accept the Russian's story that Anders had attacked Jones, who in turn shot him.

Tigerfish detects approaching Soviet aircraft. Ferraday has Vaslov use the tracker to locate the capsule, which is discovered buried in half a foot of ice. They conclude the capsule is armed with an explosive booby trap that will go off if tampered with, but Vaslov successfully disarms it and removes the film, and replaces it with an empty container.

A large force of Soviet paratroopers arrive and demand the film. Its commander, Colonel Ostrovsky, produces a detonator, and tells Ferraday he can explode the capsule, film and all, even inside the submarine, if the Americans try to leave with it. Ferraday hands over the capsule, but Ostrovsky discovers the film is missing and orders his troops to open fire on the Americans and a brief firefight ensues. 

In the confusion, Vaslov tries to take the film but is wounded by Jones. Ferraday orders him to give the film to the Soviets. The canister is sent aloft by weather balloon for recovery by aircraft. Moments before it is taken, Ferraday activates a detonator he had found that had been cached with the tracking device, destroying the film and denying either side the locations of the other's missile silos. The Soviet colonel concedes that crucial parts of both his and Ferraday's missions are effectively accomplished, with no more of either yet attainable, and leaves.

Tigerfish completes the rescue of the civilians. A teletype machine reveals media headlines claiming that a joint US-Soviet rescue in the Arctic has been successful, and that the "humanitarian mission" stands as a sterling example of peaceful cooperation between the United States and the Soviet Union.

Cast 

 Rock Hudson as Cdr. James Ferraday
 Ernest Borgnine as Boris Vaslov
 Patrick McGoohan as David Jones
 Jim Brown as Capt. Leslie Anders
 Tony Bill as Lt. Russell Walker
 Lloyd Nolan as Admiral Garvey
 Alf Kjellin as Col. Ostrovsky
 Gerald S. O'Loughlin as Lt. Cdr. Bob Raeburn
 Ted Hartley as Lt. Jonathan Hansen
 Murray Rose as Lt. George Mills
 Ron Masak as Paul Zabrinczski
 Sherwood Price as Lt. Edgar Hackett
 Lee Stanley as Lt. Mitgang
 Joseph Bernard as Jack Benning

Production

Development
The film rights to the 1963 Alistair McLean novel were acquired the following year by producer Martin Ransohoff, who hoped to capitalize on the success of 1961's blockbuster adaptation of a 1957 McLean novel into The Guns of Navarone, Hollywood's #2 grossing picture that year.  He expected the film to cost around $5 million.

"Our aim is to produce films that are both interesting and commercial," said Ransohoff. "We are looking for stories that have something unique to say." Ransohoff's company, Filmways, had a deal with MGM to provide financing.

Paddy Chayefsky, who had just written The Americanization of Emily for Ransohoff, was hired to write the script.

Navarone stars Gregory Peck and David Niven were initially attached to the film, with Peck as the submarine commander and Niven as the British spy, plus Edmond O'Brien and George Segal in the other key roles. John Sturges was borrowed from The Mirisch Company to direct.

Filming was set to begin in April 1965, but scheduling conflicts and United States Department of Defense objections over Paddy Chayefsky's screenplay because they felt it showed "an unfair distortion of military life" that would "damage the reputation of the Navy and its personnel" delayed the start. A new script was commissioned.

In January 1967 MGM announced the film would be one of 13 movies it would make during the next year.

Casting 
Due to scheduling conflicts, the original cast was no longer available when filming began in the spring of 1967. Rock Hudson had replaced Gregory Peck by February. After making four flop comedies in a row, Hudson had been keen to change his image; he had just made Seconds and Tobruk, and Ice Station Zebra was an attempt to continue this. According to his publicist, Hudson personally lobbied for the starring role in this film which “revitalized” his career. In June 1967, Laurence Harvey and Patrick McGoohan joined the cast as the Russian agent and British agent, respectively. In July, Ernest Borgnine replaced Harvey. Other key roles were played by Jim Brown and Tony Bill, who signed a five-picture contract with Ransohoff,.

There were no women in the cast. "It was the way Maclean wrote it," said Hudson.

Filming 
Filming began in June 1967. The film was budgeted at $8 million. Principal photography lasted 19 weeks, ending in October 1967. By the time it was finished the cost had risen to $10 million.

Ice Station Zebra was photographed in Super Panavision 70 by Daniel L. Fapp. The fictional nuclear-powered submarine Tigerfish (SSN-509) was portrayed in the movie by the diesel-electric Guppy IIA class sub  when seen on the surface. For submerging and surfacing scenes, the diesel-electric Guppy IA  (SS-322) was used, near Pearl Harbor. The underwater scenes used a model of a  nuclear submarine. George Davis, head of the art department at MGM, spent two years researching interior designs for the submarine.

Second unit cameraman John M. Stephens developed an innovative underwater camera system that successfully filmed the first continuous dive of a submarine, which became the subject of a documentary featurette, The Man Who Makes a Difference.

During filming, Patrick McGoohan had to be rescued from a flooded chamber by a diver who freed his trapped foot, saving his life. As he was also making his television series The Prisoner during principal photography on Ice Station Zebra, McGoohan had the episode "Do Not Forsake Me Oh My Darling" re-written to have the mind of his character transferred into the body of another character.

Release
Ice Station Zebra was not popular with audiences, losing substantial money. It premiered at the Cinerama Dome in Los Angeles on October 23, 1968 where Rock Hudson was heckled at the premiere.  The film opened to the general public the following day. The film earned theatrical rentals of $4.6 million domestically.

The escalating production costs of this film, along with the poorly-received The Shoes of the Fisherman at the same time, led to the transfer of MGM President Robert O'Brien to chairman of the board, though he resigned that position in early 1969, after both films were released and failed to recoup their costs.

Reception
Ice Station Zebra received mixed reviews from critics.

On December 21, 1968, Renata Adler reviewed the film for The New York Times: "a fairly tight, exciting, Saturday night adventure story that suddenly goes all muddy in its crises... It doesn't make much difference, though... The special effects, of deep water, submarine and ice, are convincing enough—a special Super Panavision, Metrocolor, Cinerama claustrophobia... (The cast) are all stock types, but the absolute end of the movie—when the press version of what happened at a Russian-American polar confrontation goes out to the world—has a solid, non-stock irony that makes this another good, man's action movie, (there are no women in it) to eat popcorn by."

In the March 1969 issue of Harper's Magazine, Robert Kotlowitz wrote: "... a huge production, one of those massive jobs that swallow us alive... For action it has crash dives, paratroopers, Russian spies, off-course satellites, and a troop of Marines, the average age of whom seems to be fourteen. It also has Rock Hudson...Patrick McGoohan...Ernest Borgnine, Jim Brown, and enough others to field maybe three football teams. And best of all there is also some nice suspense and pacing for at least two-thirds of the movie's three-hour length. It comes apart a bit only when the mystery starts to unravel; but that is the nature of mysteries..." Kotlowitz's review suggests that seeing the film in theaters equipped for Super Panavision 70 played a significant role in a viewer's experience: What really got me was the kind of details that the immense, curving Cinerama screen was able to offer... Every single glistening drop of bow spray can be seen as it comes pouring over the submarine's surface, caught by a camera strapped to the conning tower. There are beautiful abstract patterns made by the sub as it cuts its way through the North Sea, all the gleaming, meticulous, finely wrought, intricate machinery inside the sub, and huge chunks of mountainous ice hanging down from the roof of the ice cap like molars. Nothing could distract me from that screen, not even several minutes of confused story-telling at the end of the film... Buy some popcorn and see the movie.At the time of the film's release Variety's brief review praised it, highlighting the performances: "Film’s biggest acting asset is McGoohan, who gives his scenes that elusive ‘star’ magnetism. He is a most accomplished actor with a three-dimensional presence all his own. Hudson comes across quite well as a man of muted strength. Borgnine's characterization is a nicely restrained one. Brown, isolated by script to a suspicious personality, makes the most of it."

In April 1969, Roger Ebert of the Chicago Sun-Times described it as "so flat and conventional that its three moments of interest are an embarrassment" and called it "a dull, stupid movie". He expressed disappointment that the special effects did not, in his opinion, live up to advance claims, comparing them unfavorably to the effects in 2001: A Space Odyssey. (MGM pulled the hugely successful 2001: A Space Odyssey from Cinerama venues in order to make way for Ice Station Zebra.)

Writing for TCM, Lang Thompson calls the film "a nifty thriller of spies, submarines and saboteurs that captivated no less a personage than Howard Hughes, who reportedly watched it hundreds of times. You certainly won't regret watching it once." Thompson is referring to the fact that "In the era before VCRs, Howard Hughes would call the Las Vegas TV station he owned and order them to run a particular movie. Hughes so loved Ice Station Zebra that it aired in Las Vegas over 100 times."

In the September/October 1996 issue of Film Comment, Director John Carpenter contributed to the magazine's long-running Guilty Pleasures feature. He included Ice Station Zebra on his list, asking "Why do I love this movie so much?"

As of August 2020, Ice Station Zebra holds a 47% "Rotten" rating on the review aggregator Rotten Tomatoes.

Awards and nominations 
Ice Station Zebra was nominated in two categories at the 41st Academy Awards, for Best Special Visual Effects (nominees: Hal Millar and Joseph McMillan Johnson, won by 2001: A Space Odyssey) and Best Cinematography (nominee: Daniel L. Fapp, won by Romeo and Juliet).

Similar historical events 
The plot has parallels to events from April 1959 concerning Discoverer 2, a missing experimental US Corona satellite capsule that inadvertently landed near Spitsbergen, Norway, in the Arctic Ocean on April 13.  It was believed to have been recovered by Soviet agents. In 2006, the US National Reconnaissance Office declassified information stating that "an individual formerly possessing Corona access was the technical adviser to the movie" and admitted "the resemblance of the loss of the Discoverer II capsule, and its probable recovery by the Soviets" on Spitsbergen Island. The story has parallels with the CIA's Project COLDFEET, which took place in May and June 1962. In this operation, two American officers parachuted from a CIA-operated Boeing B-17 Flying Fortress to an abandoned Soviet ice station. They were picked up three days later by the B-17 using the Fulton surface-to-air recovery system.

The sabotage aboard the submarine that nearly resulted in its sinking is based on the loss of the Royal Navy's  in Liverpool Bay in 1939. In that case, however, the drip cock was accidentally blocked on the newly built craft by fresh paint, which led to the rear cap being opened while the bow cap was already open to the sea. Water entered at the rate of one ton per second and Thetis sank with the loss of 98 lives. In the movie, the drip cock was intentionally blocked with epoxy glue.

See also

 List of American films of 1968

Notes  
References

Bibliography

External links

 
 
 
 
 
 Movie review at AlistairMacLean.com
 “Ice Station Zebra”: The North American Roadshow and 70mm Engagements

1968 films
1960s action thriller films
1960s English-language films
American action thriller films
Cold War submarine films
Cold War spy films
Films scored by Michel Legrand
Films based on British novels
Films based on works by Alistair MacLean
Films directed by John Sturges
Films set in the Arctic
Metro-Goldwyn-Mayer films
Techno-thriller films
Films about the United States Marine Corps
Filmways films
1960s American films